Blaniulus troglobius is a species of millipede in the Blaniulidae family that is endemic to France.

References

Julida
Millipedes of Europe
Animals described in 1886
Endemic arthropods of Metropolitan France